Franco Florio may refer to:

 Franco Florio (footballer) (born 1976), Italian footballer
 Franco Florio (athlete) (born 2000), Argentine sprinter and rugby sevens player